WIBG may refer to:

 WIBG-FM, a radio station (94.3 FM) licensed to serve Avalon, New Jersey, United States
 WWAC, a radio station (1020 AM) licensed to serve Ocean City/Somers Point, New Jersey, which held the call sign WIBG from 1978 to 2021
 WNTP, a radio station (990 AM) licensed to serve Philadelphia, Pennsylvania, United States, known as WIBG from 1924 to 1977